How to Train Your Dragon 2: Music from the Motion Picture is a soundtrack album to the 2014 film How to Train Your Dragon 2, and was released by Relativity Music Group on June 13, 2014. The film is a sequel to the 2010 film How to Train Your Dragon, which itself based on the British book series of the same name by Cressida Cowell, and is the second instalment in the How to Train Your Dragon film series. The score is composed by John Powell, who also scored for its predecessor. In addition to the original score featured, Powell also collaborated with Jónsi, to write two songs for the film, which were performed by Jónsi, Gerard Butler, Craig Ferguson and Mary Jane Wells, while a song "Into a Fantasy" performed by Alexander Rybak was released on June 9, and was included in the European version of the soundtrack. Much like the score of the first instalment, this score received critical acclaim praising Powell for his work in the film. A limited edition soundtrack was published by Varèse Sarabande label in May 2022. It featured previously unedited cues and demos from the compositions.

Development 
Powell described the project "a maturation story" and stated that he too tried to achieve the same maturation in the structure of his music by developing further every aspect of his compositions from the original film. By late-2012, Powell had begun writing music for the film and took eighteen months to complete. Recording took place during April 2014 at Abbey Road Studios in London with a 120-piece orchestra, a 100-voice choir, and a wide array of ethnic instruments, including celtic harp, uilleann bagpipes, tin whistle, bodhrán, and Highland bagpipes; the latter of which were performed by pipers from the Scottish group The Red Hot Chilli Pipers. The ensemble was conducted by the composer's usual collaborator Gavin Greenaway. After recording was done, Powell worked on the mixing, music editing, mastering and technical arrangements of the score material.

The main cue "Lost and Found" was one of the central themes, he had composed for the film. Some of the cues, had incorporated from the score of the first film, including the score cue for Hiccup and Toothless flying, being taken from the first film. All the score materials, for the preliminary characters were reused from its counterpart, for the introduction to its sequel for the first eight minutes. The use of Northern European instruments for the Vikings sequence, which in turn created a "viking music" genre, Powell had stated this in an interview to Time, saying "The way we associate certain sounds with cultures is a learned thing, and often it’s not necessarily the truth. What we think of as Norse music and British Isle music, all these folk traditions are completely up for grabs. You have bagpipes in every part of the world. It’s just a very common pipe."

Sigur Rós' lead vocalist, Jónsi, who wrote and performed the song "Sticks & Stones" for the first film, provided two new original songs for the sequel in collaboration with Powell: "For the Dancing and the Dreaming" (performed by Gerard Butler, Craig Ferguson & Mary Jane Wells) and "Where No One Goes" (performed by Jónsi himself). Belarusian-Norwegian artist Alexander Rybak, who voices Hiccup in the Norwegian dub of the film, also wrote and performed the song "Into a Fantasy". The latter song is featured only in the European versions of the film.

Reception 
Zanobard Reviews assigned a score of 8/10, calling it as "the score to How To Train Your Dragon 2 is nothing short of magnificent". He further wrote "Powell took all the best thematic elements from his previous score and then expertly intertwined them with some pretty fantastic new ones, altogether making for a rather breathtaking and indeed highly enjoyable album." Movie Wave's James Southall wrote "How to Train Your Dragon 2 takes the first score, does all the good things it did, adds even more great ones.  There’s Wagnerian theatrics, genuine emotion, rousing action, thrilling adventure, an endless array of bright colours." City Newspaper's Matt DeTurck wrote "Composer John Powell's score to "How to Train Your Dragon 2" musically achieves what we hope from all sequels: incorporating established themes while expanding them with new elements that are just as strong. It's a delicate line to tread, but it's one that Powell faces with aplomb."

Renowned for Sound-based Marcus Floyd wrote "The soundtrack to How To Train Your Dragon 2 is a collection of unique tracks that would reign suitable for an action packed animated feature such as those in the How To Train Your Dragon trilogy; each piece obviously had a story to tell, as would each scene in the film and it would seem they would go hand in hand to deliver a strong impacting film." Jonathan Broxton wrote "if How to Train Your Dragon 2 is anything to go by, Powell is nowhere close to running out of ideas, or of falling out of love with the medium. This score is spectacular – by far the most enjoyable romp of 2014 to date; anyone who loved the first score in this series will surely have the same reaction here, and anyone who loves good, old-fashioned, proper orchestral music, written by a composer who knows what he’s doing, performed by an ensemble of musicians at the top of their game, and containing an overwhelmingly positive sense of life, joy and enthusiasm will love it too."

Track listing 
A soundtrack album for the film was released on June 13, 2014, by Relativity Music Group. The album features over an hour of score by Powell; with additional music by Anthony Willis and Paul Mounsey, as well as the two original songs written by Powell and Jónsi. Rybak's song "Into a Fantasy" was released separately as a single on June 9, before the album release. The vinyl edition of the soundtrack was released in August 2014.

Deluxe edition 
On March 11, 2022, a deluxe edition of the soundtrack was announced by Varèse Sarabande. It featured several of the unreleased and edited cues from the score material produced by John Powell, which were released into a two-disc set while also featuring previously edited demos as bonus tracks. The deluxe edition was released digitally on May 13, with a physical release is yet to be announced.

Release history

Awards and nominations

References 

2014 soundtrack albums
Animated film soundtracks
2010s film soundtrack albums
How to Train Your Dragon
John Powell (film composer) soundtracks